Bácsalmás is a district in southern part of Bács-Kiskun County. Bácsalmás is also the name of the town where the district seat is found. The district is located in the Southern Great Plain Statistical Region.

Geography 
Bácsalmás District borders with Jánoshalma District  and Kiskunhalas District to the north, the Serbian districts of North Bačka to the east and West Bačka to the south, Baja District to the west and north. The number of the inhabited places in Bácsalmás District is 10.

Municipalities 
The district has 1 town, 1 large village and 8 villages.
(ordered by population, as of 1 January 2013)

The bolded municipality is city, italics municipality is large village.

Demographics

In 2011, it had a population of 20,094 and the population density was 38/km².

Ethnicity
Besides the Hungarian majority, the main minorities are the German (approx. 1,100), Croat (550), Roma (300) and Serb (100).

Total population (2011 census): 20,094
Ethnic groups (2011 census): Identified themselves: 19,600 persons:
Hungarians: 17,512 (89.35%)
Germans: 1,062 (5.42%)
Croats: 568 (2.90%)
Gypsies: 291 (1.48%)
Others and indefinable: 167 (0.85%)
Approx. 500 persons in Bácsalmás District did not declare their ethnic group at the 2011 census.

Religion
Religious adherence in the county according to 2011 census:

Catholic – 12,041 (Roman Catholic – 12,019; Greek Catholic – 21);
Reformed – 1,048;
Evangelical – 36;
other religions – 169; 
Non-religious – 2,016; 
Atheism – 138;
Undeclared – 4,646.

Gallery

See also
List of cities and towns of Hungary

References

External links
 Postal codes of the Bácsalmás District

Districts in Bács-Kiskun County